The Detroit Stars were a Negro league baseball team that played from 1913 until 1926.

Detroit Stars may also refer to:
Indianapolis ABCs (1931-1933), known as the Detroit Stars in 1933
Detroit Stars (1937), a Negro league baseball team that played in 1937 only
Detroit–New Orleans Stars, a minor Negro league baseball team, known as the Detroit Stars from 1954 until 1957 and again in 1959